Control center or Control Center may refer to:

Physical facilities
 Control room, a central space where a large physical facility or physically dispersed service can be monitored and controlled
 Area control center, a type of air traffic control facility
 Mission control center, a facility that manages aerospace vehicle flights
 Missile launch control center or Launch control center, an intercontinental ballistic missile control facility
 NORAD Control Center, a Cold War-era joint command center for USAF and Army Air Defense Commands
 Poison control center, a type of telephone support facility for exposure to poison or hazardous substances
 Rumor control center, a facility designed to communicate accurate information during crises

Computing
 Control Center (iOS), a feature of Apple's iOS mobile operating system
 Control Panel (Windows), a part of the Microsoft Windows graphical user interface 
 Switching Control Center System, a 1970s-era telecommunications computer system
 IBM Control Center, a proprietary IBM software